Mesocyclops  is a genus of copepod crustaceans in the family Cyclopidae. Because the various species of Mesocyclops are known to prey on mosquito larvae, it is used as a nontoxic and inexpensive form of biological mosquito control.

Biological control
Individuals of Mesocyclops can be easily harvested, bred and released into freshwater containers where the Aedes aegypti mosquito larvae (the vector of Dengue fever) live. A big advantage of the Mesocyclops is that it is possible to teach schoolchildren how to recognize and collect them so that communities are able to perform sustainable mosquito control without much professional or governmental assistance.

A field trial in Vietnam has shown that large-scale elimination of Aedes aegypti larvae is possible. Because Mesocyclops is a host for the parasitic round worm Guinea worm (Dracunculus medinensis, the causative agent of dracunculiasis), this method is potentially hazardous in the small number of countries where the Guinea worm still occurs. Furthermore, many cultures have traditions and customs that forbid the introduction of animals into freshwater storage vessels as dangerous taboos.

Species
The genus Mesocyclops contains 92 species and 2 species nomen dubium:

Mesocyclops acanthoramus Holynska & Brown, 2003
Mesocyclops aequatorialis Kiefer, 1929
Mesocyclops affinis van de Velde, 1987
Mesocyclops albicans (G. W. Smith, 1909)
Mesocyclops americanus Dussart, 1985
Mesocyclops annae Kiefer, 1930
Mesocyclops annulatus (Wierzejski, 1892)
Mesocyclops araucanus Löffler, 1962
Mesocyclops arcanus Defaye, 1995
Mesocyclops asiaticus Kiefer, 1932
Mesocyclops aspericornis (Daday, 1906)
Mesocyclops australiensis (G. O. Sars, 1908)
Mesocyclops augusti Papa & Holynska, 2013
Mesocyclops bernardi Petkovski, 1986
Mesocyclops bodanicola Kiefer, 1955
Mesocyclops borneoensis Dussart & Fernando, 1988
Mesocyclops bosumtwii Mirabdullayev, Sanful & Frempong, 2007
Mesocyclops brasilianus Kiefer, 1933
Mesocyclops brevisetosus Dussart & Sarnita, 1987
Mesocyclops brooksi Pesce, De Laurentiis & Humphreys, 1996
Mesocyclops chaci Fiers (in Fiers, Reid, Iliffe & Suárez-Morales), 1996
Mesocyclops cuttacuttae Dumont & Maas, 1985
Mesocyclops dadayi Holynska, 1997
Mesocyclops darwini Dussart & Fernando, 1988
Mesocyclops dayakorum Holynska, 2000
Mesocyclops dissimilis Defaye & Kawabata, 1993
Mesocyclops dussarti van de Velde, 1984
Mesocyclops edax (Forbes, 1891)
Mesocyclops ellipticus Kiefer, 1936
Mesocyclops evadomingoi Gutierrez-Aguirre & Suarez-Morales, 2001
Mesocyclops ferjemurami Holynska & Nam, 2000
Mesocyclops francisci Holynska, 2000
Mesocyclops friendorum Holynska, 2000
Mesocyclops geminus Holynska, 2000
Mesocyclops granulatus Dussart & Fernando, 1988
Mesocyclops guangxiensis Reid & Kay, 1992
Mesocyclops holynskae Karanovic, 2006
Mesocyclops insulensis Dussart, 1982
Mesocyclops intermedius Pesce, 1985
Mesocyclops iranicus Lindberg, 1936
Mesocyclops isabellae Dussart & Fernando, 1988
Mesocyclops jakartensis Alekseev (in Alekseev, Haffner, Vaillant & Yusoff), 2013
Mesocyclops kawamurai K. Kikuchi, 1940
Mesocyclops kayi Holynska & Brown, 2003
Mesocyclops kieferi van de Velde, 1984
Mesocyclops leuckarti (Claus, 1857)
Mesocyclops longisetus (Thiébaud, 1912)
Mesocyclops major G. O. Sars, 1927
Mesocyclops mariae Guo, 2000
Mesocyclops medialis Defaye, 2001
Mesocyclops meridianus (Kiefer, 1926)
Mesocyclops meridionalis Dussart & Frutos, 1986
Mesocyclops microlasius Kiefer, 1981
Mesocyclops microspinulosus Lindberg, 1942
Mesocyclops monardi (Perret, 1925)
Mesocyclops mongoliensis Kiefer, 1981
Mesocyclops nigerianus Kiefer, 1932
Mesocyclops notius Kiefer, 1981
Mesocyclops obsoletus (Koch, 1838)
Mesocyclops ogunnus Onabamiro, 1957
Mesocyclops paludosus Lindberg, 1956
Mesocyclops papuensis van de Velde, 1987
Mesocyclops paranaensis Dussart & Frutos, 1986
Mesocyclops parentium Holynska, 1997
Mesocyclops pehpeiensis Hu, 1943
Mesocyclops pescei Petkovski, 1986
Mesocyclops pilosus Kiefer, 1930
Mesocyclops pseudoannae van de Velde, 1987
Mesocyclops pseudomeridianus Defaye & Dussart, 1989
Mesocyclops pseudooperculatus (Lindberg, 1957)
Mesocyclops pseudospinosus Dussart & Fernando, 1988
Mesocyclops pubiventris Holynska & Brown, 2003
Mesocyclops rarus Kiefer, 1981
Mesocyclops reidae Petkovski, 1986
Mesocyclops restrictus Dussart & Fernando, 1985
Mesocyclops ruttneri Kiefer, 1981
Mesocyclops salinus Onabamiro, 1957
Mesocyclops shenzhenensis Guo, 2000
Mesocyclops simillimus Brady, 1907
Mesocyclops sondoongensis Tran & Holynska, 2015
Mesocyclops spinosus van de Velde, 1984
Mesocyclops splendidus Lindberg, 1943
Mesocyclops strenuus (Daday, 1905)
Mesocyclops tenuisaccus (G. O. Sars, 1927)
Mesocyclops thermocyclopoides Harada, 1931
Mesocyclops tobae Kiefer, 1933
Mesocyclops trispinosus (Shen & Tai, 1964)
Mesocyclops woutersi van de Velde, 1987
Mesocyclops wraniki Baribwegure & Dumont, 2000
Mesocyclops yenae Holynska, 1998
Mesocyclops yesoensis Ishida, 1999
Mesocyclops yutsil Reid in Fiers, Reid, Iliffe & Suárez-Morales, 1996

Mesocyclops cokeri Najam-un-Nisa, Mahoon & Irfa Khan, 1987 (nomen dubium)
Mesocyclops forbesi Najam-un-Nisa, Mahoon & Irfa Khan, 1987 (nomen dubium)

Mesocyclops brehmi Kiefer, 1927 → Thermocyclops brehmi (Kiefer, 1927)
Mesocyclops brevifurcatus Harada, 1931 → Thermocyclops crassus (Fischer, 1853)
Mesocyclops consimilis Kiefer, 1934 → Thermocyclops consimilis Kiefer, 1934
Mesocyclops crassus (Fischer, 1853) → Thermocyclops crassus (Fischer, 1853)
Mesocyclops curvatus Kiefer, 1981 → Mesocyclops salinus Onabamiro, 1957
Mesocyclops decipiens Kiefer, 1929 → Thermocyclops decipiens (Kiefer, 1929)
Mesocyclops delamarei Lescher-Moutoué, 1971 → Kieferiella delamarei (Lescher-Moutoué, 1971)
Mesocyclops dybowskii (Landé, 1890) → Thermocyclops dybowskii dybowskii (Landé, 1890)
Mesocyclops emini (Mrázek, 1898) → Thermocyclops emini (Mrázek, 1898)
Mesocyclops gracilis (Lilljeborg, 1853) → Metacyclops gracilis (Lilljeborg, 1853) 
Mesocyclops hyalinus (Rehberg, 1880) → Thermocyclops hyalinus (Rehberg, 1880)
Mesocyclops ianthinus Harada, 1931 → Thermocyclops ianthinus Harada, 1931
Mesocyclops incisus Kiefer, 1932 → Thermocyclops incisus (Kiefer, 1932)
Mesocyclops infrequens Kiefer, 1929 → Thermocyclops infrequens (Kiefer, 1929)
Mesocyclops inopinus (Kiefer, 1926) → Thermocyclops inopinus (Kiefer, 1926)
Mesocyclops inversus Kiefer, 1936 → Thermocyclops inversus (Kiefer, 1936)
Mesocyclops macracanthus Kiefer, 1929 → Thermocyclops macracanthus (Kiefer, 1929)
Mesocyclops maheensis Lindberg, 1941 → Thermocyclops maheensis Lindberg, 1941
Mesocyclops minutus Lowndes, 1934 → Thermocyclops minutus (Lowndes, 1934)
Mesocyclops neglectus G. O. Sars, 1909 → Thermocyclops neglectus (Sars G.O., 1909)
Mesocyclops nicaraguensis Herbst, 1960 → Mesocyclops edax (Forbes, 1891)
Mesocyclops oblongatus G. O. Sars, 1927 → Thermocyclops oblongatus (Sars G.O., 1927)
Mesocyclops oithonoides (G. O. Sars, 1863) → Thermocyclops oithonoides (Sars G.O., 1863)
Mesocyclops operculifer Kiefer, 1930 → Thermocyclops operculifer Kiefer, 1930
Mesocyclops orghidani Plesa, 1981 → Thermocyclops orghidani (Plesa, 1981)
Mesocyclops rectus Lindberg, 1937 → Thermocyclops rectus (Lindberg, 1937)
Mesocyclops retroversus Kiefer, 1929 → Thermocyclops retroversus (Kiefer, 1929)
Mesocyclops rylovi Smirnov, 1928 → Thermocyclops rylovi rylovi (Smirnov, 1928)
Mesocyclops schmeili (Poppe & Mrázek, 1895) → Thermocyclops schmeili (Poppe & Mrázek, 1895)
Mesocyclops schuurmanae Kiefer, 1928 → Thermocyclops schuurmanae (Kiefer, 1928)
Mesocyclops spinifer (Daday, 1902) → Mesocyclops annulatus (Wierzejski, 1892)
Mesocyclops taihokuensis Harada, 1931 → Thermocyclops taihokuensis Harada, 1931
Mesocyclops tenellus (G. O. Sars, 1909) → Tropocyclops tenellus (Sars G.O., 1909)
Mesocyclops tenuis (Marsh, 1910) → Thermocyclops tenuis (Marsh, 1910)
Mesocyclops tinctus (Lindberg, 1936) → Thermocyclops tinctus Lindberg, 1936
Mesocyclops trichophorus Kiefer, 1930 → Thermocyclops trichophorus Kiefer, 1930
Mesocyclops varius Dussart, 1987 → Mesocyclops brasilianus Kiefer, 1933
Mesocyclops venezolanus Dussart, 1987 → Mesocyclops brasilianus Kiefer, 1933
Mesocyclops vermifer Lindberg, 1935 → Thermocyclops vermifer Lindberg, 1935
Mesocyclops vizarae Fryer, 1957 → Thermocyclops vizarae (Fryer, 1957)

References

Cyclopidae
Cyclopoida genera
Taxonomy articles created by Polbot